Jean Capperonnier (1716, Montdidier, Somme – 1775) was a French classical scholar.

He succeeded his uncle Claude Capperonnier, also a distinguished scholar, as the Greek chair at the Collège de France. He published valuable editions of classical authors including Caesar, Anacreon, Plautus, and Sophocles.  In 1770 he was named to the Académie des Inscriptions et Belles-Lettres.

He was a close friend of Diderot's, and he is mentioned often in the correspondence between the Abbé Galiani and Mme d'Epinay.

1716 births
1775 deaths
People from Montdidier, Somme
French classical scholars
Academic staff of the Collège de France
Members of the Académie des Inscriptions et Belles-Lettres